Canan Topçu (born 1965, Bursa, Turkey) is a Turkish-German writer.

She arrived in Germany in 1973 and studied literature at Leibniz University Hannover. Her works deal mainly with migration and integration. Since 2003, she has been working as a professor at Hochschule Darmstadt.

Works
 May Ayim, Canan Topçu (Red.): …aus dem Inneren der Sprache. Internat. Kulturwerk, Hildesheim 1995
 Canan Topçu: EinBÜRGERung. Lesebuch über das Deutsch-Werden. Portraits, Interviews, Fakten. 1. Aufl., Brandes & Apsel, Frankfurt am Main 2007

References

External links 

Living people
German women writers
Turkish writers
Turkish emigrants to West Germany
1965 births
Turkish women writers
People from Bursa